Robert Lee High School is a public high school located in Robert Lee, Texas (USA) and classified as a 1A school by the UIL. It is part of the Robert Lee Independent School District located in northwestern Coke County. In 2015, the school was rated "Met Standard" by the Texas Education Agency.

Athletics
The Robert Lee Steers compete in these UIL 1A sports:
Basketball
Cross country running
Six-man football
Golf
Tennis
Track and field

State titles
Girls' basketball  1978
Boys' golf  1990, 1991, 1992, 2008, 2009, 2010, 2011
Girls' golf  1994

Notable alumni
Winnie Baze, American football player

References

External links

Robert Lee ISD
List of Six-man football stadiums in Texas

Schools in Coke County, Texas
Public high schools in Texas
Public middle schools in Texas